The Adventures of Christopher Wells is a 30-minute radio crime drama broadcast on CBS from September 28, 1947, to June 22, 1948. It was heard at 10 p.m. on Sunday during 1947, and in 1948 it aired on Tuesday at 9:30 p.m. The shift to Tuesday was fatal, as it placed the drama opposite Fibber McGee and Molly on NBC.

Sponsored by DeSoto-Plymouth, the program was created and directed by Ed Byron, who also created the more successful Mr. District Attorney.

Myron McCormick had the title role of globe-trotting journalist Wells, and Charlotte Lawrence portrayed Stacy McGill, Wells' assistant. Les Damon and Vicki Vola took over those lead roles in February 1948. Edward A. Byron was producer-director. Peter Van Streeden furnished the background music.

Robert Shaw's scripts usually placed Wells in a different country each week. For Newsweek, Byron offered a back story on Wells, noting that he was born September 28, 1912, sold newspapers and worked as a $16-a-week cub reported on a New York daily newspaper before becoming a featured columnist with traits of Nellie Bly, Richard Harding Davis and Walter Winchell.

References

American radio dramas
1940s American radio programs
1947 radio programme debuts
1948 radio programme endings
CBS Radio programs